Two Prudential Plaza is a  skyscraper in Jacksonville, Florida. Located in the Southbank area of Downtown, the building currently serves as the regional office of Prudential Financial and is also home to other companies, including FIS and Interline Brands. The 21-floor structure was designed by KBJ Architects and completed in 1985.

Gallery

See also

 Architecture of Jacksonville
 Downtown Jacksonville
 List of tallest buildings in Jacksonville
 List of tallest buildings in Florida

References

Prudential Financial buildings
Skyscraper office buildings in Jacksonville, Florida
Postmodern architecture in Florida
Downtown Jacksonville
Southbank, Jacksonville
Jacksonville Modern architecture
KBJ Architects buildings
Office buildings completed in 1985
1985 establishments in Florida